Peckoltia furcata is a species of catfish in the family Loricariidae. It is native to South America, where it occurs in the Ucayali River basin in Peru. The species reaches 9.2 cm (3.6 inches) SL. While not common in the trade, it is sometimes kept in aquaria, although it has no associated L-number or widely used common name.

References 

Fish described in 1940
Ancistrini